The 2008 Women's British Open Squash Championship was held at the Echo Arena in Liverpool from 6 to 12 May. Nicol David won the event for the third time, beating Jenny Duncalf in the final.

Seeds

Draw and results

First qualifying round

Second qualifying round

Final qualifying round

First round

Quarter-finals

Semi-finals

Final

References

Women's British Open Squash Championships
Squash in England
Sports competitions in Liverpool
Women's British Open Squash Championship
2000s in Liverpool
Women's British Open Squash Championship
2008 in women's squash